Audrey Rose is a 1977 American psychological horror drama film directed by Robert Wise and starring Marsha Mason, Anthony Hopkins, and John Beck. Its plot follows a New York City couple who are sought out by a stranger who believes their adolescent daughter is a reincarnation of his deceased one. It is based on the 1975 novel of the same name by Frank De Felitta, who also adapted the screenplay.

Plot
Bill and Janice Templeton live a privileged life in Manhattan's Upper West Side with their 11-year-old daughter, Ivy. Over a period of several weeks, they begin to notice a stranger following them in various public places, and Janice grows alarmed when she sees the man follow her and Ivy home one afternoon. The man eventually reaches out to the couple by phone, revealing himself as Elliot Hoover, a widower who lost his wife and young daughter, Audrey Rose, in a car accident in Pittsburgh. The couple agree to have dinner with Elliot, during which he explains that he believes their daughter, Ivy, is a reincarnation of Audrey, and that details relayed to him by psychics confirm his suspicions; the details he is aware of include intimate knowledge of the couple's apartment and Ivy's bedroom. Furthermore, Ivy was born only minutes after Audrey died.

Bill, a skeptic, believes Elliot is extorting the family. He invites Elliot to their apartment, and arranges for his attorney friend, Russ, to listen covertly to their conversation from upstairs. When Elliot speaks Audrey's name, Ivy hears him from her room and enters an altered state of panic, which is only calmed by Elliot's presence. In this state, she bangs her hands against the cold window, and it leaves inexplicable burns. Elliot comforts her, after which she recognizes him as "daddy" and slowly falls asleep. Elliot insists that Ivy's burns are evidence of her reincarnation, as Audrey burned to death in the car accident. Bill grows enraged by Elliot and forces him out, punching him in the face, but Janice and even Russ are sympathetic to the strange man's plea.

One night while Bill is working late, Ivy experiences another night terror, in which she thrashes around the apartment violently. Janice, unable to control her, is surprised by Elliot's appearance at her door, and eagerly allows him in to help calm Ivy, but Bill remonstrates with Janice when he learns of the visit. During Ivy’s next episode, Elliot again arrives and Bill attacks him. After a struggle, Elliot locks the couple out of their apartment and disappears with Ivy through a service exit. An attendant informs the couple that Elliot rented an apartment in the building earlier that day. Police quickly discover him and Ivy in the apartment, apprehend him, and charge him with child abduction.

A trial ensues, during which Janice and Bill have Ivy sent to a Catholic boarding school in upstate New York to shield her from the public. During the trial, Elliot attempts to persuade the jury that his actions were necessary to grant peace to the spirit of his daughter, Audrey. The trial becomes an international news story, with a Hindu holy man testifying about their religious belief in reincarnation, to which Elliot ascribes. When questioned on the stand, Janice relents and admits that she believes Elliot, and that he had only pure interests in helping Ivy. The judge grants a recess in the trial, and Janice and Bill are subsequently informed that Ivy has injured herself at her boarding school by crawling toward a fire pit during a Christmas celebration.

After Ivy is treated for burns, Janice remains in upstate New York, and the two spend the evening in a hotel. In the middle of the night, Janice finds Ivy repeatedly greeting herself as Audrey Rose in the bathroom mirror. In a motion to complete Elliot's trial, Bill and Janice's attorney requests that Ivy be hypnotized as a means of proving she is not a reincarnation of Audrey. The hypnotist employs a past life regression hypnosis, which is observed in a hospital by the jury, along with Elliot, Bill, and Janice. The hypnosis reaches a fever pitch as Ivy revisits the traumatic car crash that took Audrey's life, and she begins to react violently. She eventually loses consciousness, and Elliot smashes the one-way mirror to access the room and attempt to calm her, but she dies in his arms.

Some time later, Janice writes a letter to Elliot, thanking him for transporting Ivy's cremated remains to India, and expressing her hope that Bill will come to accept her and Elliot's belief that Ivy was a reincarnation of Audrey. A closing intertitle quotes the Bhagavad-Gita:

Cast

Production

Casting
Director Robert Wise began an extensive search to cast the title role, initially auditioning young actresses in major cities such as Los Angeles and New York. Susan Swift was eventually cast in the role after auditioning in Austin, Texas. The film marked her feature debut.

Filming
Principal photography of Audrey Rose began on July 26, 1976, on sound stages in Los Angeles and Culver City, California. Filming continued through November, when the production moved to New York City, where exterior sequences were shot on location. The film had a production budget of approximately $4 million.

Release

Critical response
, the film has a score of 55% on Rotten Tomatoes based on 20 reviews.

Vincent Canby of The New York Times wrote: "The soul of the movie is that of The Exorcist instantly recycled." Gene Siskel of the Chicago Tribune gave the film three stars out of four and called the first hour "excellent" but the second half "pretty bad ... The picture falls apart as it turns into a dumb legal melodrama replete with cross-examination and a hypnotized key witness." Charles Champlin of the Los Angeles Times praised the "first-rate acting" but added "In a way, 'Audrey Rose' may go too far in denying the mystery and proclaiming the certainty of reincarnation. The handling denies the story of some of the spookiness of an exercise in style like Don't Look Now, and the literalness has a way of putting off those who might be willing to go along for the ride." For Newsweek, Janet Maslin wrote that Audrey Rose lacked "not only any sign of intelligence, but also that other prerequisite of a good horror movie - fast pacing"; and Judith Crist in the Saturday Review wrote that the film "starts out as a titillating little thriller, but after 20 minutes, it bogs down in a series of minilectures on reincarnation that wipe out whatever dramatic potential the story might have had."

More mixed was Richard Combs writing for The Monthly Film Bulletin: "Before the film collapses into [...] bathetic nonsense [...] it displays a dramatic rationale and figurative substance that makes it at least as diverting as Rosemary's Baby, and a cut above the special effects hocus-pocus of its nearer predecessors in the demonology genre." Paul Petlewski for Cinefantastique was measured in his assessment: "Although Audrey Rose is an honourable film, it isn't particularly memorable or even an important one [...] Its interest is partly historical the [Val] Lewton connection and partly aesthetic - the pleasure derived from watching a talented director attempt to transcend his silly material."

Home media
MGM Home Entertainment released the film on DVD on August 28, 2001. In October 2014, Twilight Time released a Blu-ray edition limited to 3,000 copies.

References

Sources

External links
 
 
 
 

1977 films
1977 horror films
American ghost films
American psychological horror films
American supernatural horror films
1970s English-language films
Films about reincarnation
Films based on American horror novels
Films directed by Robert Wise
Films set in New York City
Films shot in Los Angeles County, California
Films shot in New York City
Films scored by Michael Small
United Artists films
1970s American films
 Metro-Goldwyn-Mayer films